Sir Mark Jeremy Walport  (born 25 January 1953) is an English medical scientist and was the Government Chief Scientific Adviser in the United Kingdom from 2013 to 2017 and Chief Executive of UK Research and Innovation (UKRI) from 2017 to 2020.

Education 
Walport is the son of a general practitioner and was born in London. He was educated at St Paul's School, London, studied medicine at Clare College, Cambridge, and completed his clinical training at Hammersmith, Guy's and Brompton Hospitals in London. He was awarded a PhD for research into complement receptors under the supervision of Peter Lachmann in 1986 at the University of Cambridge.

Career and research 
Previously Walport was Director of the Wellcome Trust from 2003 to 2013. Before this, he was Professor of Medicine (from 1991) and Head of the Division of Medicine (from 1997) at Imperial College London, where he led a research team that focused on the immunology and genetics of rheumatic diseases.

Walport was the eleventh Government Chief Scientific Adviser from 2013 to 2017, succeeding Sir John Beddington.

It was announced in February 2017 that Mark Walport is now Chief Executive of UK Research and Innovation (UKRI).

Honours and awards 
Walport was knighted in the 2009 New Year Honours list for services to medical research. He was elected an Honorary Fellow of the Royal Society of Edinburgh (FRSE) in 2017 and a Fellow of the Royal Society (FRS) in 2011. His nomination for the Royal Society reads:

References 

 

1953 births
Living people
Medical doctors from London
Alumni of Clare College, Cambridge
British immunologists
British rheumatologists
Wellcome Trust
Academics of Imperial College London
Knights Bachelor
Fellows of the Academy of Medical Sciences (United Kingdom)
Fellows of the Royal Society
People educated at St Paul's School, London
Fellows of the Royal Society of Edinburgh
Fellows of the Royal College of Physicians